The Rivière aux Chevreuils (in English: Deer River) is a tributary of the south shore of the rivière du Chêne which empties on the south shore of the St. Lawrence River, in the administrative region of Chaudière-Appalaches, in Quebec, in Canada.

The “Rivière aux Chevreuils” flows through the regional county municipalities (MRC) of:
 L'Érable Regional County Municipality: municipality of Lyster;
 Lotbinière Regional County Municipality: municipalities of Sainte-Agathe-de-Lotbinière, Saint-Janvier-de-Joly and Val-Alain.

Geography 

The main neighboring watersheds of the “Rivière aux Chevreuils” are:
 north side: rivière du Chêne, Saint-Georges River;
 east side: Armagh River, Filkars River;
 south side: Palmer River, Perdrix River, Bécancour River;
 west side: rivière du Chêne.

The Rivière aux Chevreuils has its source south of the village of Sainte-Agathe-de-Lotbinière, near Chemin Gosford. This head area is located to the north of the Bécancour River, in the “Chutes de Sainte-Agathe” area.

From its source, the “Rivière aux Chevreuils” flows more or less in parallel (south side) with Rivière du Chêne (Leclercville) and on the north side of Perdrix River.
  north, passing east of the village of Sainte-Agathe-de-Lotbinière, to a country road;
  northwest, to a country road;
  west, to the municipal limit of Lyster which constitutes the limit between the MRCs of Lotbinière Regional County Municipality and L'Érable Regional County Municipality;
  west, to a road in a place called "Le Nordêt";
  northwest, crossing a large area of marshes and collecting water from the Bisson-Laflamme stream (coming from the southwest), to route 116;
  west, to a road;
  north-west, up to the limit of Saint-Janvier-de-Joly;
  north-west, to its confluence.

The “Rivière aux Chevreuils” flows on the south bank of the rivière du Chêne,  (in a direct line) east of the center of the village of Val-Alain.

Toponymy 

The toponym "rivière aux Chevreuils" was made official on December 5, 1968, at the Commission de toponymie du Québec.

See also 

 List of rivers of Quebec

References 

Rivers of Chaudière-Appalaches
L'Érable Regional County Municipality